WSEV (930 AM) operates as Sevierville, Tennessee's first and only local AM radio station.  While other stations are licensed to Sevierville, their studios are based in Knoxville, Tennessee.

History
WSEV is the heritage station in Sevierville. It has aired the talents of future country singers, including Dolly Parton. In 1990 the station was purchased, along with its FM sister station WSEV-FM 105.5, by the Dollywood Broadcasting Company, a privately owned corporation whose shareholders included Parton; managing partner Orr & Earls Broadcasting, Inc., of Branson, Missouri; and other investors. The AM station's call letters remained WSEV, but the FM's call letters were changed to WDLY 105.5 to reflect the connection with Parton. In 1992 a remote broadcast booth was built on the Dollywood theme park, similar to the WSM (AM) broadcast booth located at the Opryland USA theme park in Nashville, Tennessee.

WSEV's format fluctuated during the 1990s. Its programming mostly consisted of classic country during the day, with mornings featuring "Swap and Shop," a locally produced call-in show for buyers and sellers of household items, local news throughout the day, and a simulcast of the WDLY-FM modern country signal at night. Locally produced sports-talk programming continued to be added to the schedule.

In 2000, the East Tennessee Radio Group purchased WSEV-AM and sister WDLY-FM from the Dollywood Broadcasting Company and later moved the studios from their old location on Middle Creek Road in Sevierville, Tennessee, to their current location on Dumplin Valley Road in Kodak, Tennessee. Prior to adopting the current sports-talk format, WSEV simulcasted WSEV-FM's "Mix 105.5" adult contemporary format.

East Tennessee Radio Group sold WSEV (AM) to Grand Crowne Resorts with application filed on April 21, 2008.

Some snippets of the station’s former country format are heard in Dollywood’s Lightning Rod attraction.

Recent history (circa 2010)
WSEV is a "barker" station: It broadcasts continuous advertisements for the Pigeon Forge area attractions, interspersed with Tennessee Trivia and comedy routines by "Milton Crabapple, Sheriff of Crabapple County". Billboards on approaching highways tout the station to incoming travelers.

Milton Crabapple explains life in Crabapple County, telling the exploits of himself and the other citizens,  all of whom seem to have "Crabapple" as either their surnames or parts of their names (such as a "cousin in show business", P.T. Crabapple).

In 2012, WSEV changed its imaging from Pigeon Forge Radio to Smoky Mountain Radio.

On August 19, 2015, owner Grand Crowne Resorts took WSEV silent for financial reasons and applied to the FCC for authority to remain silent for 180 days.

On November 9, 2015, AllAccess.com reported that Grand Crowne was selling WSEV to Bristol Broadcasting Co. for $25,000. Bristol owns stations in the Bristol, Tennessee/Virginia area, and the Paducah KY and Charleston WV broadcast markets. 
 The sale was consummated on January 14, 2016.

References

External links

SEV (AM)
Radio stations established in 1990